The 2021–22 HockeyAllsvenskan season was the 17th season that the second tier of Swedish ice hockey operated under that name. The series consists of 14 teams playing a regular season in which each team play each other team four times, twice at home and twice away. This is followed by a series of promotion and relegation tournaments, with the teams finishing first through tenth participating in promotion playoffs, and the teams finishing 13th and 14th forced to requalify to avoid relegation to the Hockeyettan.

Participating teams

Regular season

Standings

Statistics

Scoring leaders

The following shows the top ten players who led the league in points, at the conclusion of matches played on 16 March 2022. If two or more skaters are tied (i.e. same number of points, goals and played games), all of the tied skaters are shown.

Leading goaltenders
The following shows the top ten goaltenders who led the league in goals against average, provided that they have played at least 40% of their team's minutes, at the conclusion of matches played on 16 March 2022.

Post-season

Playoff bracket

Eighth-finals
Teams 7–10 from the regular season will play best-of-three playoff series, where team 7 face team 10 and team 8 face team 9. In each series the higher-seeded team have home-ice advantage, playing at home for game 1 (plus 3 if necessary) while the lower-seeded team play at home for game 2. The winners move on to the quarterfinals.

Mora IK vs. Tingsryds AIF

Västerviks IK vs. AIK

Quarterfinals
Teams 1–6 from the regular season, along with the winners of the eighth-finals, will play best-of-seven series, with the winners moving on to the semifinals. The highest-seeded team chose whether to play the second-lowest seed or the lowest seed. In each series the higher-seeded team has home-ice advantage, playing at home for games 1 and 2 (plus 5 and 7 if necessary) while the lower-seeded team plays at home for games 3 and 4 (plus 6 if necessary) The higher-seeded half of the teams chose their opponents, with the highest-seeded remaining team choosing at each step.

HV71 vs. Västerviks IK

Modo Hockey vs. Kristianstads IK

BIK Karlskoga vs. Mora IK

IF Björklöven vs. Västerås IK

Semifinals
The winners of the quarterfinals play best-of-seven series, with the winners moving on to the Finals. The highest-seeded team chose whether to play the second-lowest seed or the lowest seed. In each series the higher-seeded team has home-ice advantage, playing at home for games 1 and 2 (plus 5 and 7 if necessary) while the lower-seeded team plays at home for games 3 and 4 (plus 6 if necessary).

HV71 vs. BIK Karlskoga

Modo Hockey vs. IF Björklöven

Finals
The winners of the semifinals will play a best-of-seven series, with the winner being promoted to the Swedish Hockey League (SHL). The higher-seeded team has home-ice advantage, playing at home for games 1 and 2 (plus 5 and 7 if necessary) while the lower-seeded team play at home for games 3 and 4 (plus 6 if necessary).

HV71 vs. IF Björklöven

Play Out
Teams 13 and 14 from the regular season will play a best-of-seven series, with the winner remaining in HockeyAllsvenskan and the loser being relegated to Hockeyettan. The higher-seeded team has home-ice advantage, playing at home for games 1 and 2 (plus 5 if necessary) while the lower-seeded team playeat home for game 3 (plus 4 if necessary).

Södertälje SK vs. IF Troja-Ljungby

References

External links 
Official site

Sweden
Allsvenskan
HockeyAllsvenskan seasons